The following applications can be used to create playable DVDs.

Free software
Free software implementations often lack features such as encryption and region coding due to licensing restrictions issues, and depending on the demands of the DVD producer, may not be considered
suitable for mass-market use.

 DeVeDe (Linux)
 DVD Flick (Windows only)
 DVDStyler (Windows, Mac OS X, and Linux using wxWidgets. Recent versions are bundled with Potentially Unwanted Programs that may accidentally be installed unless care is taken during installation.)

Professional studio software
 MAGIX Vegas DVD Architect (previously known as Sony Creative Software's DVD Architect Pro) (discontinued)
 Apple DVD Studio Pro (Mac) (discontinued)
 Sonic DVDit Pro (formerly DVD Producer) (discontinued)
 Adobe Encore (EOL / discontinued)
 Sonic DVD Creator (discontinued)

Professional corporate software
 MAGIX Vegas DVD Architect (previously known as Sony Creative Software's DVD Architect Pro) (discontinued)
 Adobe Encore (Last version is CS6, bundled with Adobe Premiere Pro CS6 / EOL) (discontinued)
 Sonic Scenarist SD/BD/UHj
MediaChance DVD-lab (discontinued)

Home 
 Apple iDVD (Mac)
 CyberLink Media Suite
 Nero Vision
 Pinnacle Studio
 Roxio Easy Media Creator
 Roxio Toast (for Mac OS)
 Sonic MyDVD
6552458

88
 TMPGEnc DVD Author
 Ulead DVD MovieFactory
 Windows DVD Maker (discontinued)
 WinDVD Creator
 Ashampoo Burning Studio

See also
DVD-Video
DVD authoring
DVD ripper

References

List

DVD
DVD
DVD